Akash (IAST: Ākāśa) is a medium-range mobile surface-to-air missile (SAM) system developed by the Defence Research and Development Organisation (DRDO) and produced by Bharat Dynamics Limited (BDL). Surveillance and Fire control radar, tactical control and command center and missile launcher are developed by Bharat Electronics (BEL), Tata Power Strategic Engineering Division and Larsen & Toubro. It has the capability to neutralise aerial targets like fighter jets, cruise missiles and air-to-surface missiles as well as ballistic missiles. It is in operational service with the Indian Army and the Indian Air Force.

An Akash battery comprises a single Rajendra 3D passive electronically scanned array radar and four launchers with three missiles each, all of which are interlinked. Each battery can track up to 64 targets and attack up to 12 of them. The Akash system is fully mobile and capable of protecting a moving convoy of vehicles. The launch platform has been integrated with both wheeled and tracked vehicles. While the Akash system has primarily been designed as an air defence SAM, it also has been tested in a missile defense role.
The Indian military's combined orders of the Akash, including radar systems (WLR and Surveillance), have a total worth of ₹28,800 crore (US$4 billion). As per Ministry of Defence (MoD) Report 2018, existing order of Akash saved ₹34,500 crore of foreign exchange for India on imports.

Description

System
Each Akash battery consists of four self-propelled Launchers (3 Akash SAMs each), a Battery Level Radar - the Rajendra, and a Command post (Battery Control Centre). Two batteries are deployed as a Squadron (Air Force), while up to four form an Akash Group (Army configuration). In both configurations, an extra Group Control Centre (GCC) is added, which acts as the Command and Control HQ of the Squadron or Group. Based on a single mobile platform, GCC establishes links with Battery Control Centres and conducts air defense operations in coordination with air defense set up in a zone of operations. For early warning, the GCC relies on the Central Acquisition Radar. However, individual batteries can also be deployed with the cheaper, 2-D BSR (Battery Surveillance Radar) with a range of over 100 km.
Akash has an advanced automated functioning capability. The 3D CAR automatically starts tracking targets at a distance of around 150 km providing early warning to the system and operators. The target track information is transferred to GCC. GCC automatically classifies the target. BSR starts tracking targets around a range of 100 km. This data is transferred to GCC. The GCC performs multi-radar tracking of up to 200 targets and carries out track correlation & data fusion. Target position information is sent to the BLR which uses this information to acquire the targets.

The BCC which can engage a target(s) from the selected list at the earliest point of time is assigned the target in real time by the GCC. The availability of missiles and the health of the missiles are also taken into consideration during this process. Fresh targets are assigned as and when intercepts with assigned targets are completed. A single shot kill probability of 88% has been achieved by the system taking into consideration various parametres of the sensors, guidance command, missile capabilities and kill zone computations.

There are a number of possibilities for deploying Akash weapon system in autonomous mode and in group mode for neutralizing the threat profiles with defined multi-target engagement scenarios. In the Group mode we can have number of configurations to defend vulnerable areas depending upon nature and expected threat pattern, characteristics of threat. Similarly, multiple batteries in autonomous mode can be deployed to defend vulnerable areas/points. In a Group formation, the four Batteries can be deployed in various geometric formations, as suited to the vulnerable area being protected and the extent desired to be sanitized from enemy air threat. In a box deployment pattern, an Akash group can defend an area of 62 km x 62 km. In a linear array configuration, it covers an area of 98 km x 44 km. Trapezoidal configuration gives defense to the largest area as compared to any other pattern of deployment covering an area of size 5,000 square km.

Each Akash battery can engage up to four targets simultaneously with 24 ready to fire missiles. Each battery has four launchers with three missiles, while each Rajendra able to guide eight missiles in total, with a maximum of two missiles per target. Up to a maximum of four targets can be engaged simultaneously by a typical battery with a single Rajendra if one (or two) missile is allotted per target. A single Akash missile has an 88% probability of kill. Two missiles can be fired, five seconds apart, to raise the probability of Kill to 98.5%. Communications between the various vehicles are a combination of wireless and wired links. The entire system is designed to be set up quickly and to be highly mobile for high survivability. The Akash system can be deployed by rail, road or air.

Missile

Akash is a surface-to-air missile with an intercept range of 25 km. It has a launch weight of 720 kg, a diameter of 35 cm and a length of 5.78 meters. Akash flies at supersonic speed, reaching around Mach 2.5. It can reach an altitude of 20 km and can be fired from both tracked and wheeled platforms. An on-board guidance system coupled with an actuator system makes the missile maneuverable up to 15g loads and a tail chase capability for end game engagement. A digital proximity fuse is coupled with a 55 kg pre-fragmented warhead, while the safety arming and detonation mechanism enables a controlled detonation sequence. A self-destruct device is also integrated. It is propelled by an Integrated Ramjet Rocket Engine. The use of a ramjet propulsion system enables sustained speeds without deceleration throughout its flight. The Missile has command guidance in its entire flight.

The design of the missile is somewhat similar to that of the SA-6 with four long tube ramjet inlet ducts mounted mid-body between wings. For pitch/yaw control four clipped triangular moving wings are mounted on the mid-body. For roll control four inline clipped delta fins with ailerons are mounted before the tail. However, the internal schematic shows a different layout with an onboard digital computer, no Semi-active seeker, different propellant, different actuators and command guidance datalinks. The Akash carries an onboard radio-proximity fuse.

Composite technology for Akash includes radome assemblies, booster liners, ablative liners, sustainer liners, compression molded wings and fins.

Propulsion
The Akash, like the Russian 2K12 Kub (SA-6 Gainful), utilizes an integrated ramjet-rocket propulsion system, which, after initial rocket motor burnout, provides sustained thrust for the missile throughout its flight until interception.

Radars

The missile is guided by a phased array fire control radar called 'Rajendra' which is termed as Battery Level Radar (BLR) with a tracking range of about 60 km. The tracking and missile guidance radar configuration consists of a slewable phased array antenna of more than 4,000 elements, spectrally pure TWT transmitter, two stage superheterodyne correlation receiver for three channels, high speed digital signal processor, real time management computer and a powerful radar data processor. It can track 64 targets in range, azimuth and height and guide eight missiles simultaneously in ripple fire mode towards four targets. The radar has advanced ECCM features. The Rajendra derivative on a BMP-2 chassis and to be used by the Indian Air Force is known as the Battery Level Radar-II whereas that for the Army, is based on a T-72 chassis and is known as the Battery Level Radar-III.

The Army version also consists of the Battery Surveillance Radar (BSR). BSR is a track vehicle based, long range sensor, interfaced with the BCC. It can detect and track up to 40 targets in range and azimuth up to a range of 100 km.

Long range target acquisition is performed by the 3D Central Acquisition Radar (3D CAR), which is a long range surveillance radar that can track up to 200 targets in Track while Scan mode (detecting, tracking and processing) in three dimensions at a range of 180 km. It provides azimuth, range and height coordinates of targets to the Group Control Centre (GCC) through secure communication links. The data is used to cue the weapon control radar.

Platforms

The Army's radar and launchers are based on the T-72 chassis built by the Ordnance Factories Board's Ordnance Factory Medak to accompany the Army's fast moving armoured formations. The Air Force versions use a combination of tracked and wheeled vehicle. The Air Force Akash launcher consists of a detachable trailer which is towed by a Tata truck, which can be positioned autonomously. The Air Force launcher is designed by Larsen & Toubro jointly with DRDO. Both the Army and Air Force launchers have three ready-to-fire Akash missiles each. The launchers can slew in both elevation and azimuth. The Army Self-Propelled Launcher (ASPL) is 360 degrees slewable and its arc in elevation is from 6 to 60 degrees. The Akash Air Force Launcher (AAFL) is 360 degree slewable, in elevation it can fire from 8 to 55 degrees in all directions depending on the mode of deployment. Akash Air force launcher features an All electro servo drive system for fully automated and remote operation.
To enable the Akash group to perform self-sufficient in the combat zone, a number of supporting specialist vehicles have been designed and developed. They are mobile and field-worthy. Their design is based on the role and task to be performed and the vehicles are accordingly allocated to the Group HQ, the Batteries, Assembly Line Area and the Field maintenance workshop. Some of the vehicles are: the Missile Transportation Vehicle (MTV), the Transportation and Loading Vehicle (TLV), the Mobile Station for Missile Checkout (MSMC) Vehicle, the Air Compressor Vehicle (ACV), the Power Supply vehicles (GPSV, BPSV), the Engineering Support, Maintenance and Repair vehicles (GEM, BEM) and a few others. These specialist vehicles assemble and prepare missiles, deliver them to Batteries, carry maintenance spares and fuel, and provide logistical engineering support. Their allocation provides for flexibility and self-sufficiency to the whole Akash Group.

Development and history

Mark-I
The first test flight of Akash missile was conducted in 1990, with development flights up to March 1997.

Two Akash missiles intercepted two fast moving targets in simultaneous engagement mode in 2005. 3-D Central Acquisition Radar (3D-CAR) group mode performance is also fully established.

The Akash Missile Development cost of ₹1,000 crore (€150 million; $200 million), including the project sanction of ₹600 crore (€90 million; $120 million), is 8-10 times lower than the cost of similar system developments in other countries. Akash has certain unique characteristics like mobility, all-the-way-powered flight till target interception, multiple target handling, digitally-coded command guidance and fully automatic operation.

Variants

Akash-1S
There was demand from Indian Armed Forces for a missile with a seeker that can target inbound targets more accurately for which the DRDO offered an upgraded Akash with an indigenous seeker named Akash-1S. DRDO tested Akash-1S on 25 May and 27 May 2019 with a strike range of 30 km that has the capability to carry warhead of 60 kg from Integrated Test Range (ITR), Chandipur, Odisha with the overall performance of indigenous seeker and guidance system consistently established during the period. Akash-1S was fired five times against multiple targets and successfully completed the trials. It supports the combination of both command and active terminal seeker guidance to enhance the single shot kill probability and is capable of striking down fighter jets and drones at a distance of around 18 to 30 km that can be fired from both tracked and wheeled platforms for greater mobility.

Akash Prime

On 27 September 2021, DRDO test fired a new version of missile called Akash Prime. It intercepted and destroyed an unmanned aerial target mimicking enemy aircraft, in its maiden flight. Akash Prime is based on the existing Akash SAM. The missile is equipped with an improved active radio-frequency (RF) seeker to further increase the accuracy. Akash Prime is also optimized for low temperature and high altitude operations with modified ground system.

Akash-NG 

Akash-NG will have an improved reaction time and higher level of protection against saturation attacks. The second stage uses dual-pulse solid rocket motor which is lighter instead of air-breathing solid ramjet engine to increase the overall range from current 40 km to 70 km, an active electronically scanned array Multi-Function Radar (MFR) and optical proximity fuze.

Status
Each missile is expected to have starting costs below US$500,000 i.e. under ₹2 crore which is less than half the cost of similar Western missiles which usually cost between US$1.2-1.5 million (₹5-6 crore) each. It is expected that this cost will further decrease due to the economies of scale achieved as production ramps up. The Indian military (IAF & IA) have a combined order worth ₹23,300 crore ($5.18 billion).
On 24 May 2012, India successfully test fired Akash missile to revalidate technology and operational efficacy. On 1 June 2012, the Air Force version of the missile with a strike range of 25 km was successfully test fired from the Integrated Test Range at Chandipur. On 3 August 2014 Akash missile test-fired from launch complex-3 of ITR at Chandipur off Odisha coast, Describing the trials as "fully successful", Director ITR said . The Air Force version has already been inducted while the Army version is in the final stage of its trial. The Army version was inducted on 5 May 2015, as was tweeted by MoD Spokesman.

 On 16 March 2016, Director of Defence Research and Development Laboratory (DRDL), said that India is looking to double missile production to 100 per month, up from 50 to 60.

Indian Air Force
In December 2007, the Indian Air Force completed user trials for this missile. The trials, which were spread over ten days, were declared successful after the missile hit the target on five occasions. Multiple targets handling capability of Akash weapon system was demonstrated by live firing in C4I environment. Before the ten-day trial at Chandipur, ECCM Evaluation tests were carried out at Gwalior Air force base and mobility trials were carried out in Pokhran. The IAF had evolved the user Trial Directive to verify the Akash's consistency. The following trials were conducted: Against low-flying near-range target, long-range high-altitude target, crossing and approaching target and ripple firing of two missiles from the same launcher against a low-altitude receding target.

The Indian Air force was satisfied with the performance of Akash after extensive flight trials and has decided to induct the weapon system. An order for two squadrons were placed initially, with these being inducted in 2009. The IAF found the missile performance to be satisfactory and was expected to place orders for 16 more launchers to form two more squadrons for India's northeast theater.

In May 2008, the Indian Air Force decided to induct two squadrons (totaling 4 batteries) of Akash missile.

In March 2009, Tata Power's Strategic Engineering Division (Tata Power SED) announced that it had secured the ₹182 crore order for 16 Akash launchers to be delivered in the next 33 months.

In January 2010, it was revealed that the Indian Air Force had ordered for 6 more squadrons. Each squadron will consist of 125 missiles, bringing the order to 750 missiles for 6 squadrons. The first two squadrons will consist of 48 missiles each while future squadrons will vary in number depending on the IAF. The additional missiles were ordered from state-run defence behemoth Bharat Electronics, who will act as the system integrator, at a cost of 4,279 crore ($925 million).

On 3 March 2012, the missile was officially inducted into Indian Air force at function at Hyderabad.

IAF orders may also rise as it phases out its Pechoras and if the Indo-Israeli JV to develop a MRSAM (Medium Range SAM) for the IAF continues to be put on hold, while a similar program for the Indian Navy proceeds unimpeded.
On 6 June 2012, IAF successfully test fired the Air Force version of Akash missile from the Integrated Test Range at Chandipur. Indian Air Force tested Akash missiles taken from the production lot on 26 April 2014 against maneuvering targets at extreme ranges. The test was a success.

In February 2010, the Indian Air Force accepted the Akash missile system as a substantial part of its arsenal.

In November 2014 Surface-to-air supersonic missile Akash on Friday completed its training user trials successfully for 5 straight days validating all mission parametres as set by the Indian Air Force (IAF) team.

On 10 July 2015, the Akash surface-to-air missile was formally inducted in the Indian Air Force at Gwalior.

On 1 September 2015, the Defence Acquisition Council (DAC) cleared the purchase of seven additional squadrons of the Akash missile for the Indian Air Force.On 28 January 2016, the missile was successfully test fired from complex-3 of the Integrated Test Range (ITR) at Chandipuri in Odisha. As part of a user trial from the ITR, three rounds of test were carried out by the Indian Air Force (IAF) personnel aiming at para-barrel target. Tests were aimed at gauging the flight consistency and effectiveness of the missile, besides ascertaining the serviceability of the system in various conditions.

On 8 March 2016, Indian Air Force(IAF) demonstrated the missile at the exercise Iron Fist 2016.

A Comptroller and Auditor General report released in 2017 stated that due to lack of adequate storage facilities, the life span of the missiles may be affected.  In addition, there was a 30% failure rate during testing of missiles in inventory with 6 out of 20 missiles failing to hit their targets.

On 28 and 29 November 2017, the Indian Air Force carried out 3 tests of the missile from Launch Complex 3 of the Integrated Test Range (ITR) against electronic targets.

On 3 December 2020, the Indian Air Force carried out 10 missile firing at Suryalanka to bolster its capability among ongoing Indo-Sino border tension. The missiles were fired to validate different scenario and majority of the missiles scored a direct kill further establishing the efficacy of Akash missile.

Indian Army

In June 2010, the Defence Acquisition Council (DAC) placed an order of the Akash missile system, valued at ₹12,500 crore ($2.8 billion). Bharat Dynamics (BDL) will be the system integrator and nodal production agency for the Akash Army variant. The Army plans to induct two regiments of the missile.

In March 2011, a report indicates that the Indian Army has ordered 2 Akash regiments – approximately 2,000 missiles – worth ₹14,000 crore ($3.1 billion). These will replace the Indian Army's 2 SA-6 Groups (25 systems with 1,500 missiles), which were inducted between 1977 and 1979.

On 5 May 2015 Akash Missile was inducted into the Indian Army.

On 11 to 13 April 2015, Indian Army successfully conducted six rounds of user trials of the missile. The tests were conducted from complex 3 of the Integrated Test Range (ITR) at Chandipuri in Odisha. The missiles targeted pilot less target aircraft (PTA) Lakshya, unmanned air vehicle (UAV) 'Banshee' and a para barrel target, two times each.

On 30 March 2016, Indian Army stated that Akash area defence missile systems did not meet its operational requirements for defending its strike corps against enemy air attacks in forward areas, and was not ordering any more regiments. The Army instead was opting for four Israeli quick reaction SAM regiments.
The missile was inducted into the Indian Army in May 2015. The Army is scheduled to get two Akash regiments by 2017. On 30 November 2017, Indian Army successfully tested fired five Akash missiles at Integrated Test Range (ITR) against multiple targets. Another test with an indigenous radio frequency seeker was successfully carried out on 5 December 2017 against a Banshee aerial drone.

In May 2022, report was published that Indian Army is going to receive 2  Regiments of Akash Prime(Improved Variant) systems.

Deployment 
The Indian Air Force has deployed Akash at its bases in Gwalior (Maharajpur AFS), Jalpaiguri (Hasimara AFS), Tezpur, Jorhat and Pune (Lohegaon AFS).

The Indian Army has deployed one Akash Regiment in June–July 2015, with the second one to be ready by end of 2016.

Indian Army deployed Akash air defence system along Line of Actual Control in Ladakh as tension rose between India and China 2020 China–India skirmishes.

Operators

 Indian Air Force — Total 8 squadrons in service as of 2022. 7 more under induction process. Each squadron contains 8 Launchers, 125 missiles.
 Indian Army — Total 2 Regiments were ordered and delivered. (24 Launchers per Regiment)

Export 
It was also reported in the media that Philippines, Belarus, Malaysia, Thailand, UAE, Vietnam and Armenia have shown interest in purchasing the Akash missile system. On 30 December 2020, Cabinet Committee on Security (CCS) chaired by Prime Minister cleared the exports of Akash missile defence system. Philippines signed an arms agreement with India in March 2021 to potentially acquire Indian weapons including the Akash Missile.

See also

Akash-NG
Type 3 Chū-SAM
KS-1
NASAMS
Barak 8
QRSAM
VL-SRSAM
Advanced Air Defence (AAD)
Prithvi Air Defence (PAD)

References

External links 

 
 Video of Akash missile tests
 Interview with Dr. Prahlada from DRDO

Surface-to-air missiles of India
Post–Cold War weapons of India
Defence Research and Development Organisation
Military equipment introduced in the 2000s